James A. Morris   was a professional baseball player who played pitcher and outfielder in the Major Leagues in 1884 for the Baltimore Monumentals of the Union Association. He appeared in one game for the Monumentals, and was hitless in three at-bats.

External links

Major League Baseball outfielders
Major League Baseball pitchers
Baltimore Monumentals players
19th-century baseball players
Chambersburg (minor league baseball) players
Baseball players from Trenton, New Jersey